USNS Washington Chambers (T-AKE-11) is a  of the United States Navy, named in honor of Captain Washington Chambers (1856–1934), a pioneer in US naval aviation.

Construction

The contract to build Washington Chambers was awarded to National Steel and Shipbuilding Company on 12 December 2008. Her keel was laid down on 25 August 2009. Washington Chambers was launched and christened on 11 September 2010 sponsored by Loretta Penn, wife of former Acting Secretary of the Navy, B.J. Penn. Washington Chambers was delivered to the US Navy's Military Sealift Command on 23 February 2011, following a series of tests and sea trials.

Operational history
The ship delivers ammunition, provisions, spare parts, potable water and petroleum products to US Navy and other navy ships at sea, allowing them to remain underway and combat ready for extended periods of time.

References

External links 

 

Lewis and Clark-class dry cargo ships
Ships built in San Diego
2010 ships